Seabird Airlines was an airline operating scheduled seaplane services in Istanbul, Turkey, and the surrounding area. Its main base was at Haliç on the Golden Horn. It was the only floatplane operator in Turkey. It also operated sightseeing flights over Istanbul.

History
The airline was established in Istanbul in 2010 by Kürşad Arusan (chairman of the board) and the German Angel Investor Christian Theisen, although it took a further two years to get all the required certification from the Turkish aviation authorities. It is part of the Burulas Havacilik Group. It ceased operations in June 2015, citing financial difficulties, most likely driven by a drop in wealthy Russian tourists (source: http://www.todayszaman.com/business_seabird-airlines-sputters-to-a-halt_387464.html)

Destinations
Its main route is between its base in Haliç to Gemlik. Other destinations are:
Alaçatı
Ayvalık
Bodrum
Bozcaada
İzmit

Fleet
The Seabird Airlines fleet is made up of the following aircraft (at February 2015):
4 de Havilland Canada DHC-6 Twin Otter Series 300

All aircraft are leased from Kenn Borek Air in Canada. Two were returned to the lessor during the winter season 2014/15.

References

External links
Official website

Turkish companies established in 2010
Airlines established in 2010
Defunct airlines of Turkey
Airlines disestablished in 2015
Defunct seaplane operators